Risaburō, Risaburo or Risaburou is a masculine Japanese given name. It can also be transliterated as Rizaburo. Notable people with the name include:

, Japanese sport wrestler
, Japanese businessman

Japanese masculine given names